Natalia Viktorovna Safonova (born 17 July 1999 in St.Petersburg, Russia) is a Russian Group rhythmic gymnast. She is the 2014 Youth Olympic Group all-around champion and the 2013 European Junior Group all-around champion.

Junior 
In 2013, Safonova was member of the Russian Group at the  2013 European Junior Championships with Russia taking the gold medal scoring a total of (33.916) ahead of Belarus (32.700) and Bulgaria (32.532) in the all-around competition. They won another gold medal in 5 hoops final.

On 26–27 August Safonova was a member of the Russian Group (with Daria Anenkova, Daria Dubova, Sofya Skomorokh, Victoria Ilina) that competed at the 2014 Youth Olympic Games in Nanjing, China where they won gold in Group All-around finals.

References

External links 
 
 
 

1999 births
Living people
Russian rhythmic gymnasts
Gymnasts at the 2014 Summer Youth Olympics
Youth Olympic gold medalists for Russia
Gymnasts from Saint Petersburg